Yaniel Carrero Zambrano (born 17 August 1995 in Trinidad, Sancti Spíritus) is a Cuban sprinter who specializes in the 100 metres.

Career
He won a gold medal in the 4 x 100 metres relay and a bronze medal 100 m at the 2014 Central American and Caribbean Championships.

His personal best time is 10.26 seconds, achieved in May 2015 in Havana. He also has 20.81 seconds in the 200 metres, achieved in June 2013 in Havana.

Personal best
100 m: 10.24 s (wind: +0.1 m/s) –  Havana, 18 March 2016
200 m: 20.81 s (wind: +1.2 m/s) –  Havana, 4 June 2013

Achievements

References

External links
 
 Ecured biography (in Spanish)

1995 births
Living people
Cuban male sprinters
People from Trinidad, Cuba
Pan American Games competitors for Cuba
Athletes (track and field) at the 2015 Pan American Games
Olympic athletes of Cuba
Athletes (track and field) at the 2016 Summer Olympics
World Athletics Championships athletes for Cuba
Central American and Caribbean Games gold medalists for Cuba
Central American and Caribbean Games bronze medalists for Cuba
Competitors at the 2014 Central American and Caribbean Games
Central American and Caribbean Games medalists in athletics